Princeps pastorum (Latin for 'Prince of the shepherds') is the title of an encyclical letter promulgated by Pope John XXIII on 28 November 1959. It is derived from a biblical passage: I Peter 5:4. In its English translation the letter opens with the phrase On the day when "the Prince of the shepherds" entrusted to Us His lambs and sheep.  It refers to Jesus Christ.

It celebrates the success of Roman Catholic missions to promote the faith, encourages the fostering of native clergy in the countries to which the missions extended and emphasises the importance of lay Catholics as representatives of the church in non-Catholic countries. The encyclical points out that while social welfare initiatives are to be supported, the primary task of missions should be to spread Catholic doctrine.

See also
 List of encyclicals of Pope John XXIII

References
'Princeps Pastorum', Catholic Encyclopedia Retrieved June 1, 2005.

Papal encyclicals
Catholic missions
Works by Pope John XXIII
1959 documents
1959 in Christianity
November 1959 events